A constitutional referendum was held in Romania on 18 and 19 October 2003. The proposed amendments to the constitution were approved by 91.1% of voters.

The 2003 referendum was the first revision of the Romanian constitution since its inception on 8 December 1991. The referendum included a variety of major changes to the constitution, namely in Articles 1, 2, 5, 9, 11, 15, 16, 20, and 21. Additionally, it included rules that heavily influenced criminal proceedings and how long the courts could hold an individual in preventive custody. The constitutional revision from 2003 also guarantees that "A person’s freedom to develop his/her spirituality and to get access to the values of national and universal culture shall not be limited."

Results

References

External links

Romania
2003 in Romania
Constitutional referendums in Romania
October 2003 events in Europe